Jeremy Rowley (born June 12, 1978) is an American character actor, voice actor, writer and comedian. He is known for playing Lewbert on the Nickelodeon television series iCarly and Bunsen in Bunsen Is a Beast.

Career
Rowley has appeared in a number of television shows and movies, often portraying somewhat "ballistic" characters, especially on television shows. On the Nickelodeon television series iCarly, Rowley (as the character Lewbert) plays a mean and nasty doorman of Bushwell Plaza, where Carly, Freddie, & Spencer all live. On Carly and Sam's web show, they have a segment called "Messin' With Lewbert" where the two girls play pranks on Lewbert downstairs in the lobby of the building.  On the show, Lewbert is recognized for having excessive anger outbursts, (i.e. when people walk all over the floor he just mopped).

Rowley has also appeared on The Amanda Show, most notably the sketch called "Blockblister" (a parody of the video retail chain Blockbuster), where he plays a customer who is angry because of the movie he rented (he paid for the video by tearing off his arm and giving it to them, replying "Keep the change!").  Again, he expresses his anger with loud outbursts in the scene. He is known as Ming on the podcast Comedy Bang! Bang!.

Rowley is a member of the improvisational and sketch comedy group called the Groundlings, based in Los Angeles, California. He also voiced Bunsen on the Nickelodeon animated series Bunsen Is a Beast, for which he gained an Annie Award nomination. 

In 2019, Rowley worked in Bless the Harts where he portrayed Jimmy Lee and Mayor Webb with the latter role being recast in later episodes to Jon Hamm.

Filmography

Internet
The Office Web Episode
Urban Meyer Press Conference Parody

Television

Film

Personal life
Rowley is married to Danielle Morrow, who also appeared on iCarly as Nora Dershlit in the episodes "iPsycho" and "iStill Psycho", and later the 2014 Sam & Cat episode "#SuperPsycho". They have a son together.

References

External links

1978 births
Living people
American male film actors
American male television actors
20th-century American male actors
21st-century American male actors
American male comedians
American male voice actors
American sketch comedians
Male actors from New York (state)
Comedians from New York (state)
20th-century American comedians
21st-century American comedians